This is a list of animated television series that were first aired in 2022.

See also 
 2022 in animation
 2022 in anime
 List of animated feature films of 2022

References 

2022
2022
Television series
Animated series
2022-related lists